A virtual field trip is a guided exploration through the World Wide Web that organizes a collection of pre-screened, thematically based web pages into a structured online learning experience. (Foley, 2003). Since 2007, another dynamic and interactive form of a virtual field trip has been – and is – freely available. The first was the Pilbara VFT (pilbara.mq.edu.au) with a much more extensive and up-to-date suite of astrobiology-related VFTs at vft.asu.edu.

The non-interactive forms of VFT are an inter-related collection of images, supporting text and/or other media, delivered electronically via the World Wide Web, in a format that can be professionally presented to relate the essence of a visit to a time or place. The virtual experience becomes a unique part of the participants' life experience. (Nix, 1999)

Virtual field trips (VFTs) started appearing around 1995  (LEARNZ), but greatly grew in popularity starting around 2000. The VFT was seen as a way to organize the educational potential of the internet in a coherent, appropriate fashion, particularly for primary and secondary education. A VFT can contain a selection of topic-specific web pages that are strung together into a grade-targeted, organized package.  Often these types of VFT are provided by commercial distributors, such as Tramline. www.tramline.com

There are a number of different formats used for VFTs and if you do a search on the Web, you will find thousands of trips. Some trips simply consist of a list of links on one web page, while other trips use some type of navigator (or buttons) to move through the tour. Following current pedagogy; in its best implementation, a VFT is a real time guided field trip that is supported by interactive pages on the Web that have been selected by educators and arranged in a "thread" that teachers and students can follow in either lineal or broad searching. The live links with experts on-site in real-time is a key aspect in creating a "real" experience for students. For example, with LEARNZ virtual field trips students have asked questions of scientists in Antarctica, mining staff underground and even electrical engineers on the top of wind turbines.

Real-time virtual field trips involve the use of videoconferencing and audioconferencing  technologies to permit students in one location to virtually visit and learn about people or places in another location. The use of Tandberg and other sound stations make this form of communication more accessible in education.  H.323 videoconferencing is increasingly used for educational virtual field trips, since this connectivity option eliminates connection costs over the commodity Internet.

A virtual field trip is a simulated, real-time field trip.  In the case of interactive video conferencing, "students interact, in a live even, with a remotely located field trip host."  Cole, Ray, Zanetis 2004

A virtual field trip for elementary learners is the opportunity to explore and see places, things, and people not normally seen on a typical classroom day. During a classroom virtual field trip, students can explore places across the high seas, states across our country, and many nearby or far away people, places, and things. This is an opportunity to see and experience the world without ever leaving the classroom.

The virtual field trip is cost-effective to schools. It eliminates the costs of renting transportation, additional insurance coverage and the cost of chaperons.

Elementary school teachers can explore many virtual field trip options through websites like Discovery Ed. There is a tremendous amount of information on the internet for planning virtual field trips geared towards this learning age. It is simple to find resources by searching the words 'virtual field trip for elementary learners' on the web.

References 
 Foley, K. (2007). The Big Pocket Guide to Using & Creating Virtual Field Trips (3rd ed.). Tramline. . .
 Online field trips boost reading scores http://www.eschoolnews.com/news/showStoryts.cfm?ArticleID=5671 From eSchool News staff and wire service reports May 19, 2005
 Nix, R. (1999). A Critical Evaluation of Science-Related Virtual Field Trips Available on the World Wide Web in partial fulfillment of the requirements in SMEC-708 Curtin University of Technology Western Australia June 10, 1999
 Videoconferencing for K12 Classrooms: A Program Development Guide, Cole, Ray, Zanetis, International Society for Technology in Education, 2004

External links
WikiFieldTrip
Tramline
LEARNZ Virtual Field Trips
M.O.E. NZ link
Center for Interactive Learning and Collaboration

Teleconferencing